The Womble Shale is a Middle Ordovician geologic formation in the Ouachita Mountains of Arkansas and Oklahoma. First described in 1892, this unit was not named until 1909 by Albert Homer Purdue in his study of the Ouachita Mountains of Arkansas, where he named this unit as part of the upper Ouachita Shale and the Stringtown Shale.  In 1918, U.S. Geological Survey geologist, Hugh Dinsmore Miser, replaced Purdue's nomenclature with the Womble Shale.  Miser assigned the town of Womble (now called Norman) in Montgomery County, Arkansas as the type locality. As of 2017, a reference section for this unit has yet to be designated.

Paleofauna

Bryozoa
 Rhinidictya

Graptolites

 Azygograptus
 Brygraptus
 Climacograptus
 C. bicornis
 C. bicornis var. peltifer
 C. caudatus
 C. parvus
 C. pultifer
 Cryptograptus
 C. insectiformis
 C. tricornis
 Desmograptus
 Dicellograptus
 D. diapason
 D. divaricatus
 D. gurleyi
 D. intorius
 D. parvangulus
 D. rectus
 D. rigidus
 D. sextans

 Dicranograptus
 D. arkansasensis
 D. nicholsoni
 D. nicholsoni var. diapason
 D. nicholsoni var. parvangulus
 D. parvangulus
 D. ramosus
 D. spinifer
 Dictyonema
 Didymograptus
 D. sagitticaulis
 D. sagitticaulus var. minimus
 D. sparsus
 D. superstes
 Diplograptus
 D. acutus
 D. (Glyptograptus) angustifolius
 D. basilicus
 D. euglyphus
 D. incisus
 D. truncatus abbreviatus

 Glossograptus
 G. ciliatus
 G. horridus
 G. quadrimucronatus var. maximus
 Glyptograptus
 G. angustifolius
 G. englyphus
 Lasiograptus
 L. bimucronatus
 L. mucronatus
 Leptograptus
 L. patulosus
 Mesograptus
 Nemagraptus
 N. gracilis
 Orthograptus

 Phyllograptus
 Retiograptus
 R. geinitzianus
 R. quadrimucronatus cornutus
 Thamnograptus
 T. capillaris

See also

 List of fossiliferous stratigraphic units in Arkansas
 Paleontology in Arkansas

References

Ordovician geology of Oklahoma
Ordovician Arkansas
 
Ordovician southern paleotropical deposits